The Santa Maria goldcrest, Regulus regulus sanctaemariae, Estrelinha-de-poupa in Portuguese, is a very small passerine bird in the kinglet family.  It is endemic to Santa Maria Island in the Azores archipelago in the North Atlantic Ocean where it is a non-migratory resident.

References

Santa Maria goldcrest
Birds of the Azores
Endemic fauna of the Azores
Santa Maria goldcrest